Colombia requires its residents to register their motor vehicles and display vehicle registration plates. The current plate design was introduced in the 1990s, but some of the previous 1972 through 1990 design remain in use.

All vehicles are required to display plates on the front and back. Peculiarly, in Colombia commercial vehicles are also required to display plates on the sides. This is usually done not with actual metal plates, but by a large decal of the license plate. This practice can also be found on taxis in neighboring Panama and Peru, but in Colombia all commercial vehicles and public transport vehicles must display them.

Current plate types

Previous plate types

References

External links

Colombia
Colombia transport-related lists
Transport in Colombia
 Registration plates